Mary Hicks (died 28 July 1716, Huntingdon) was an English woman accused of witchcraft in Huntingdon, England. She was condemned to death by Huntingdon assizes on 28 July 1716 along with her nine-year-old daughter, Elizabeth Hicks, and is thought to be the last person executed in England for witchcraft.

Biography 
Mary Hicks lived in Huntingdon with her husband, Edward and daughter Elizabeth.

Their story is recorded in an eight-page pamphlet entitled, The whole trial and examination of Mrs. Mary Hicks and her daughter Elizabeth, printed by W. Matthews (London) in 1716.  The trial accused Hicks and her daughter of taking off their stockings “in order to raise a rainstorm”.

Her investigation and execution is unusual because by the early eighteenth century many people questioned the reality of witchcraft.

References 

18th-century English women
18th-century English people
Witch trials in England
1716 deaths
Year of birth missing
People executed for witchcraft
People from Huntingdon
People executed by England by hanging